Frank Lloyd Wright designed over 425 houses, commercial buildings and other works.

"The 20th-Century Architecture of Frank Lloyd Wright" is a UNESCO World Heritage Site consisting of a selection of eight buildings across the United States designed by Wright.

Table key
 Demolished or destroyed (also noted in "Other Information")

 Regularly open to the public

 Disputed authorship (unverified Wright design)

Completed works

Posthumous constructions

Notable unbuilt works 
 University Avenue Power House, Madison, Wisconsin, 1885
 Gordon Strong Automobile Objective, Sugarloaf Mountain, Maryland, 1924
 San Marcos In The Desert, Chandler, Arizona, 1929
 Broadacre City, Chandler, Arizona, 1932–35
 Crystal Heights, Washington, DC, 1940
 Cooperative Homesteads, Madison Heights, MI, 1942
 Rogers Lacy Hotel, Dallas, Texas, 1946
 Point Park Civic Center, Pittsburgh, Pennsylvania, 1947
 Angelo Masieri Memorial, Venice, Veneto, Italy, 1951–53 
 The Illinois, Chicago, Illinois, 1956
 Plan for Greater Baghdad, Iraq, 1957–58
 Cottage Studio for Ayn Rand, Connecticut
 Lake Tahoe Summer Colony, Emerald Bay, Lake Tahoe, California, Began in 1923
 Calico Mills administrative office in Ahmedabad, India. Later Calico Dome was built on the same site.

References

External links

 Interactive Map of Frank Lloyd Buildings in situ, created in the Harvard WorldMap Platform
 James N. McNally's Photographic Guide to Frank Lloyd Wright Structures

 
Wright, Frank Lloyd
Wright, Frank Lloyd